Pool B of the First Round of the 2009 World Baseball Classic was held at Foro Sol, Mexico City, Mexico from March 8 to 12, 2009.

Pool B was a modified double-elimination tournament. The winners for the first games matched up in the second game, while the losers faced each other in an elimination game. The winners of the elimination game then played the losers of the non-elimination game in another elimination game. The remaining two teams then played each other to determine seeding for the Pool 1.

Bracket

Results
All times are Central Standard Time (UTC−06:00).

Cuba 8, South Africa 1

Australia 17, Mexico 7

Mexico 14, South Africa 3

Cuba 5, Australia 4

Mexico 16, Australia 1

Cuba 16, Mexico 4

External links
Official website

Pool B
World Baseball Classic Pool B
International baseball competitions hosted by Mexico
World Baseball Classic Pool B
World Baseball Classic Pool B
Sports competitions in Mexico City
2000s in Mexico City